Kemono (derived from  "beast") may refer to: 

 Bakemono, a class of yōkai, preternatural creatures in Japanese folklore
 Kemonomimi, the concept of depicting human and human-like characters with animal ears, and by extension, other features such as tails

See also
 Furry fandom, a subculture interested in anthropomorphic animal characters